Anatoly Stepanovich Dyatlov (3 March 1931 – 13 December 1995) was  a Soviet engineer who was the deputy chief engineer for the Chernobyl Nuclear Power Plant. He supervised the safety test which resulted in the 1986 Chernobyl disaster, for which he served time in prison as he was blamed for not following the safety protocols. He was released due to health concerns in 1990. Later investigations found that reactor design flaws were a more significant factor than operator error, although some safety procedures were not followed.

Biography
Dyatlov was born in 1931 in Krasnoyarsk Krai, Russian Soviet Federative Socialist Republic. His parents were poor; they lived near the Yenisei River and the penal settlements of Krasnoyarsk. He ran away from home at the age of 14. He first studied in a vocational school, at the electrical engineering department of the Mining and Metallurgical Technical School in Norilsk, and worked three years as an electrician before he was admitted at the Moscow Engineering and Physics Institute where he graduated in 1959 with honors.

After graduation, he worked in a shipbuilding plant in Komsomolsk-on-Amur, in Lab 23 where reactors were installed into submarines. During a nuclear accident there, Dyatlov received a radiation dose of 100 rem (1.0 Sv), a dose which typically causes mild radiation sickness, vomiting, diarrhea, fatigue and reduction in resistance to infections.

One of his two sons died of leukemia at age nine. In his personal life, he loved poetry, particularly Pushkin's Eugene Onegin.

Chernobyl 
In 1973, he moved to Pripyat, in the Ukrainian Soviet Socialist Republic, to work at the newly-constructed Chernobyl Nuclear Power Plant. His fourteen-year experience working on naval reactors in the Soviet Far East made Dyatlov one of the three most senior managers at the Chernobyl station. He was in charge of Units Three and Four. Dyatlov worked 6 or even 7 days a week for long shifts, while priding himself on his knowledge of reactor systems. However, his management style was unforgiving, projecting an image of infallibility, and he often cursed at staff who did not follow his orders to the letter. However, some workers say they respected him and the knowledge he held. To those workers he was seen as honest, responsible and a devoted man. Other seemingly "lazy" workers, who were targeted by Dyatlov's high standards, saw him as tough, stubborn and unfair. 

On 26 April 1986, Dyatlov supervised a test at Reactor 4 of the nuclear plant, which resulted in the Chernobyl disaster. In preparation, Dyatlov ordered the power to be reduced to 200 MW, which was lower than the 700 MW stipulated in the test plan. The reactor then stalled unexpectedly during test preparations. Raising power after this point put the reactor into a potentially dangerous state, due to xenon poisoning, as well as undocumented design flaws in the reactor, which were unknown to the operators at the time. One major contributing factor to the accident was the decision to raise the power level after the reactor stalled at below 30 MW. The operating manual was contradictory and lacked clear definitions, so the test program was allowed to continue.

While withdrawing a dangerous number of control rods, the operators could only reach 200 MW due to xenon poisoning. During the test, Akimov called for the AZ-5 (scram) button to be pressed to shut down the reactor. A few seconds later, the reactor exploded.

After the explosion, Dyatlov ordered the control rods to be inserted by hand; too late, he attempted to revoke his order. He also called for increased water circulation to the reactor in an attempt to cool it, not knowing most of the systems had just been destroyed. The reactor shop supervisor returned to the control room to say the reactor had been destroyed, but Dyatlov refused to believe him. Dyatlov left the control room to evaluate the situation himself, even attempting to locate lost plant worker, Valery Khodemchuk. He began to feel weak and started vomiting, caused by acute radiation syndrome, so gathered the operating logs from the control room and left for the administration building to report to Bryukhanov. During the accident, Dyatlov was exposed to a radiation dose of 390 rem (3.9 Sv), which causes death in 50 % of affected people after 30 days; ultimately, he survived.

After the accident

He was admitted to Pripyat Hospital where he initially refused treatment, saying he just needed to sleep. He was quickly transferred to Moscow Hospital 6. By 28 April, the symptoms of radiation sickness had mostly abated. During his stay, he discussed possible causes of the accident with Akimov and Toptunov, but they were mystified as to the causes. Dyatlov's condition began to worsen due to the delayed effects of his radiation exposure. He recovered thanks to hospital care, surviving what is often a lethal radiation dose.

Together with Nikolai Fomin and Viktor Bryukhanov, Dyatlov was criminally charged for failure to follow safety regulations. The trial began on 6 July 1987 at the Palace of Culture in the town of Chernobyl. Only people invited by the state were allowed to witness the proceedings. There were six defendants; Bryukhanov, Fomin, Dyatlov, station shift supervisor Boris Rogozhkin, reactor division chief Alexander Kovalenko, and inspector Yuri Laushkin. Among the defendants, only Dyatlov remained combative, saying that the operators were not responsible for the accident. Dyatlov claimed that he was not present when the reactor stalled or when the power level was increased, but this was contradicted by several witnesses. The design flaws in the reactor were not considered by the court, and any expert witnesses involved in the design were keen to avoid blame. All six were found guilty and Dyatlov was given the maximum sentence of ten years.

From prison he wrote letters trying to explain RBMK reactor flaws he had discovered, as well as to restore his and the other operators' reputations. He wrote a letter to the family of Toptunov, relating how he had tried to restore coolant to the reactor. He was granted amnesty in late 1990 due to his worsening health from radiation exposure.

He wrote a paper published in Nuclear Engineering International in 1991 and a book in which he claimed that poor plant design, rather than plant personnel, was primarily responsible for the accident.

While the initial Soviet investigation put almost all the blame on the operators, later findings by the Ministry of Atomic Energy and the IAEA found that the reactor design and how the operators were informed of safety information was more significant. However, the operators were found to have deviated from operational procedures, changing test protocols at will, as well as having made "ill judged" actions, making human error a major contributing factor.

Dyatlov died of bone marrow cancer in Kyiv, Ukraine in 1995, which was almost certainly caused by his radiation poisoning from the accident.

In media
Dyatlov was portrayed by Igor Slavinskiy in the 2004 series Zero Hour: Disaster At Chernobyl, by Roger Alborough in 2006 BBC production Surviving Disaster: Chernobyl Nuclear Disaster and by Paul Ritter in the 2019 HBO miniseries Chernobyl.

Dyatlov's memoirs were recorded in 1994, a year before his death. The recording was made by an unknown operator and appeared on YouTube in 2016. A version with English subtitles was provided in 2019.

See also 
 List of Chernobyl-related articles
 Individual involvement in the Chernobyl disaster
 Vasily Ignatenko
 Boris Shcherbina

References

External links
Dyatlov's memoirs, 1994 (1 h Video in Russian with English subtitles)

1931 births
1995 deaths
20th-century Ukrainian engineers
People from Krasnoyarsk Krai
Expelled members of the Communist Party of the Soviet Union
Moscow Engineering Physics Institute alumni
Recipients of the Order of the Red Banner of Labour
Chernobyl liquidators
Ukrainian people of Russian descent
Soviet engineers
Deaths from cancer in Ukraine
People from Norilsk